Events in the year 1992 in Norway.

Incumbents
 Monarch – Harald V
 President of the Storting – Kirsti Kolle Grøndahl (Labour Party)
 Prime Minister – Gro Harlem Brundtland (Labour Party)

Events
 1 January – The 1992 New Year's Day Storm. 

 6 June – The Fantoft stave church in Bergen, dating from the 12th century, is burnt to the ground by arsonists originating in the early Norwegian black metal scene.
 20 August – Krifast, a new road system connecting Kristiansund to the mainland of Norway, opens.
 5 September – The Norwegian commercial television station TV2 has its first television broadcast.
 25 November – Norway applies for membership in the European Union.
 16 December – The current version of the Norwegian coat of arms is approved.

Popular culture

Sports

Music

Film

Notable births

 

 2 January – Alexander Hassum, footballer
 15 January – Joshua King, footballer
 25 January – Christian Landu Landu, footballer
 27 January – Isabelle Pedersen, hurdler
 20 February – Thomas Drage, footballer
 21 February – Lavrans Solli, swimmer.
 23 February – Even A. Røed, politician.
 10 March – Ruben Gabrielsen, footballer
26 March – Petter Øverby, handball player.
 25 May – Aslak Falch, footballer
 30 June – Fredrik Haugen, footballer
17 July – Sverre Lunde Pedersen, speed skater.
 25 July – Markus Henriksen, footballer
 8 August – Mushaga Bakenga, footballer
 9 September 
 Frida Amundsen, singer and songwriter
 Simon Markeng, footballer
 10 September – Fredrik Gulbrandsen, footballer
12 September – Ragnhild Mowinckel, alpine skier.
 21 September – Eirik Ulland Andersen, footballer
 15 December – Mathilde Tybring-Gjedde, politician.
 16 December – Ulrikke Eikeri, tennis player
30 December – Erlend Svardal Bøe, politician.

Full date unknown
 Sara Nicole Andersen, model and beauty pageant

Notable deaths

 4 January – Peder Wright Cappelen, book publisher (born 1931).
 15 January – Bernt Anker Steen, jazz trumpeter (born 1943).
 20 January – Trond Hegna, journalist and politician (born 1898).
 22 January – Undis Blikken, speed skater (born 1914).
 25 January – Reidun Andersson, politician (born 1922)

 3 February – Ole Aarnæs, high jumper (born 1888)
 3 February – Agnes Bakkevig, politician (born 1910).
 7 February – Lauritz Johnson, radio presenter (born 1906).
 7 February – Gunnar Randers, physicist (born 1914).
 13 February – Bjørg Abrahamsen, textile artist (born 1931).
 18 February – Odd Grønvold, Lord Chamberlain(born 1907).
 19 February – Odd Vattekar, politician (born 1918).
 22 February – Olav Haukvik, politician (born 1928).
 23 February – Kristen Eik-Nes, biophysicist (born 1922).
 25 February – Carl Monssen, rower (born 1921)
 25 February – Einar Granum, painter and teacher (born 1920).

 17 March – Gøril Havrevold, actress (born 1914).
 27 March – Harald Sæverud, composer (born 1897).
 28 March – Elisabeth Granneman, singer (born 1930).
 29 March – Øistein Hermansen, politician (born 1919).

 6 April – Erling Wikborg, politician (born 1894).
 13 April – Gunnar Haarstad, police chief (born 1916).
 15 April – Hans Bernhard Haneberg, politician (born 1918).
 22 April – Gunnar Jakobsen, politician (born 1916)

 3 May – Einar Stavang, politician (born 1898).
 3 May – Thor Hjorth-Jenssen, actor (born 1923).
 4 May – Kjellfrid Kjær Smemo, politician (born 1911).
 10 May – Egil Endresen, jurist and politician (born 1920).
 10 May – Werner Nilsen, footballer(born 1904)
 14 May – Inga Lovise Tusvik, politician (born 1914).
 15 May – Ola Johan Gjengedal, politician (born 1900).
 23 May – Olav Eriksen, opera singer (born 1927).

 7 June – Olav Rytter, writer and radio personality (born 1903).
 9 June – Per Bergsland, RAF pilot (born 1919)
 15 June – Nils Mugaas, civil servant (born 1921).
 20 June – Per Oftedal, geneticist (born 1919).
 23 June – Axel Coldevin, historian (born 1900).
 26 June – Harald Sverdrup, poet and children's writer (born 1923).
 26 June – Willy Kristoffer Svarverud, politician (born 1927).
 29 June – Egil Solin Ranheim, politician (born 1923).

 4 July – Bobben Hagerup, jazz drummer (born 1911).
 11 July – Ulf Thoresen, harness racer (born 1946).

 3 August – Finn Ludt, pianist, composer and music critic (born 1918).
 3 August – Johannes Olai Holm, politician (born 1906).
 5 August – Bernt Bjørkø, painter and sculptor (born 1917).
 11 August – Sigmund Juul Hermann Halvorsrud, politician (born 1915).
 14 August – Holger Albrechtsen, hurdler (born 1906).
 19 August – Berge Helle Kringlebotn, politician (born 1904).
 19 August – Carsten Winger, actor (born 1907).
 20 August – Ulf Hafsten, botanist (born 1922).
 26 August – Olav Aase, politician (born 1914).
 29 August – Erling Petersen, economist and politician (born 1906).

 3 September – Ragnhild Butenschøn, sculptor (born 1912).
 5 September – Jens Arup Seip, historian (born 1905).
 17 September – Sigurd Røen, Nordic combined skier (born 1909).
 24 September – Paul Lorck Eidem, writer and illustrator (born 1909).
 27 September – Erik Rolfsen, architect (born 1905).

 5 October – Harald Haraldssøn, resistance member (born 1898).
 7 October – Julian Strøm, puppeteer (born 1901).
 11 October – Gotfred Ernø, businessperson (born 1902).
 21 October – Lillemor Aars, ceramicist (born 1904).
 27 October – Odd Brochmann, architect (born 1909).

 1 November – Pål Sundvor, writer (born 1920).
 4 November – Henrik Finne, painter and sculptor (born 1898).
 8 November – Petter Olav Johnsen Liland, politician (born 1902).
 15 November – Klaus Gjøstein, painter (born 1905).
 17 November – Egil Peter Harvold, orthodontist (born 1912).
 25 November – Aslak Versto, politician (born 1924).
 25 November – Skule Storheill, naval officer (born 1907).
 26 November – Annie Skau Berntsen, missionary (born 1911).

 1 December – Arthur Meier Karlsen, politician (born 1906).
 1 December – Magne Bleness, theatre instructor (born 1933).
 8 December – Frithjof Prydz, ski jumper and tennis player (born 1943).
 13 December – Jens Bolling, actor and theatre director (born 1915).
 14 December – Bjarne Gran, historian and radio presenter (born 1918).
 28 December – Nils Handal, politician (born 1906).

See also

References

External links